Rajegaon is a village and gram panchayat in Kirnapur tehsil of Balaghat district in Madhya Pradesh, India. It is situated on the Madhya Pradesh – Maharashtra border. Buses are available to reach it.

References 

Panchayati raj (India)
Cities and towns in Balaghat district